Aliza Gur (born Alizia Gross; 1 April 1940) is an Israeli actress who was Miss Israel of 1960 and a semifinalist in the Miss Universe pageant held in Miami Beach that same year. She played Vida in the James Bond film From Russia with Love in 1963.

Early life
Born Alizia Gross on 1 April 1940 in Ramat Gan, British Mandate of Palestine (now Israel), to a family of Ashkenazi Jewish descent. Her parents had fled Nazi Germany during Hitler's dictatorship and settled in the city of Ramat Gan where she and her brother were born. She studied at the University of Haifa, where she designed and made dresses to help pay for tuition. Her first pageant win was as Miss Haifa.

She was enlisted as a soldier in the Israel Defense Forces. Gur also and studied acting in Tel Aviv under Peter Fry, a well known director. After her success in national and international beauty pageants, she settled in California, where she began her film and television career. Her parents emigrated to the United States, as well, and settled in Cleveland, Ohio, for a time; they died in the 1970s. In 1960, she toured America to help support the purchase of Israeli Bonds.

Acting career
In 1965, she made a guest appearance on Perry Mason as Dr. Nina Rivelli in "The Case of the Baffling Bug". Her other television credits include The Big Valley, Daniel Boone, Get Smart, The Wild Wild West and Adventures in Paradise. Her film credits include Exodus (1960), A Place to Go (1962), From Russia with Love (1963), Night Train to Paris (1964), Agent for H.A.R.M. (1966), Kill a Dragon (1967), The Hand of Night (1968), and her last movie Tarzan and the Jungle Boy (1968).

Her most famous role was as Vida of two fighting gypsies in 1963's James Bond film From Russia with Love, where she fought Miss Jamaica's Martine Beswick. The female lead in the film, Daniela Bianchi, had been Gur's roommate at the 1960 Miss Universe pageant.

Personal life
Gur married twice, first in 1964 to Sy Shulman, the Director of Hollywood's Cedars of Lebanon Hospital, and next to Sheldon Schrager, and had one son from her first marriage. Both marriages ended in divorce.

Filmography

Film

Television

References

External links

1944 births
20th-century American actresses
20th-century Israeli actresses
American film actresses
American people of German-Jewish descent
American television actresses
Israeli emigrants to the United States
Israeli film actresses
Israeli people of German-Jewish descent
Jewish American actresses
Israeli Ashkenazi Jews
Living people
Miss Israel winners
Miss Universe 1960 contestants
People from Ramat Gan
21st-century American Jews
21st-century American women